Joseph Thauberger (26 August 1909 – 21 April 1998) was a Canadian farmer and politician. Born in Bessarabia (now Moldova), he emigrated to Canada from Russia with his parents, Andreas Thauberger and Maria Eva née Bähr, in 1911. 
In the 1972 federal election, Thauberger ran for the Social Credit Party of Canada in the riding of Qu’Appelle, Saskatchewan. He placed last in a field of four candidates, with 839 votes (3.1% of the total).

Joseph Thauberger helped establish the Canada Party in the early 1990s to promote a policy of nationalism and monetary reform. He became the first leader of that party.

In the 1993 election, he ran for the Canada Party in the riding of Regina—Qu'Appelle, Saskatchewan. He placed last in a field of six candidates, with 178 votes (0.55% of the total).

Thauberger stepped down from the party leadership in 1994 and was replaced by Claire Foss. The party merged into the Canadian Action Party in 1997. Joseph Thauberger died in Regina, Saskatchewan in April 1998. He is buried in Riverside Cemetery in Regina.

Joseph Thauberger's son, Dr. Patrick Cyril Thauberger, disappeared in Regina in 1997 while travelling from Winnipeg to Edmonton. He has yet to be found.

The Regina Police Service arrested Patrick Thauberger's older brother Joseph George Thauberger, on November 29, 2020 on charges of first degree murder in Patrick's death, offering an indignity to a human body and uttering threats to a woman (between 1997 and 2014).

Electoral record

References

1909 births
1998 deaths
People from Bessarabia Governorate
Emigrants from the Russian Empire to Canada
Moldovan emigrants to Canada
Social Credit Party of Canada candidates in the 1972 Canadian federal election
Canada Party candidates for the Canadian House of Commons
Candidates in the 1993 Canadian federal election
Canadian social crediters